National Sports Stadium (In  ) is a multi-purpose stadium in Ulaanbaatar, Mongolia.  It is used mostly for football matches and has a capacity 12,500. The Naadam festival, which celebrates Mongolian independence, is held there every July. The land owned by the stadium company is about 27 hectares, of which the stadium takes about 8 hectares of land. The National Sport Stadium in Mongolia hosted the 2016 World University Archery Championship.

History
The stadium was established in 1958 by Russian construction in Ulaanbaatar, Mongolia.  Since then, it has not been majorly renovated, although it gets a little painting and touch up once a year.  Even though the stadium was built for multi-use such as football and festivals, the only mandatory event is the Naadam festival held on July 11 of each year which commemorates Mongolian State Flag Day and the People's Revolution of 1921. In 1996, a military parade in the National Sports Stadium commemorated the 790th anniversary of the Mongol Empire and the 75th anniversary of the People's Revolution. Other events are usually held under a contract except those organized by the government.

Owners
The stadium is part private owned and part government owned, with a 51%/49% split. The reason for its split ownership is that there is only one stadium that can hold 2,500 people in Mongolia. If the stadium was wholly private the government would have to fund the entire Naadam festive, 70% of the costs of which are taken from ticket sales and the leasing of surrounding land.

Events 
Core Contents Media artist, including T-ara, Davichi, SPEED, and The SeeYa held a concert in the stadium on 21 September 2013

References

Football venues in Mongolia
Athletics (track and field) venues in Mongolia
Mongolia
Multi-purpose stadiums